Lake is an unincorporated community in Northumberland County, Virginia, United States. Lake is on the Coan River, a tidal tributary of the Potomac River.

Unincorporated communities in Northumberland County, Virginia
Unincorporated communities in Virginia